Chinnamandem is a village in the Annamayya district of the Indian state of Andhra Pradesh. It is located in the Chinnamandem mandal of the Rayachoti revenue division.

Geography
Chinnamandem has an elevation of 445m and lies on the Deccan Plateau.

Transport 
The National Highway 340 passes through the village, which connects Rayachoti and Madanapalli  road of Andhra Pradesh.

References 

Villages in Kadapa district